Government Post Graduate College Karak is public sector college located in Karak Khyber Pakhtunkhwa, Pakistan. The college offers programs for intermediate level both in Arts and Science groups for which it is affiliated with Board of Intermediate and Secondary Education Kohat. The college also offers 2-year BA & BSc programs plus 4 years BS programs in various disciplines  for which it is affiliated with Khushal Khan Khattak University. Government Post Graduate College Karak, was affiliated with Kohat University of Science and Technology, but after the establishment of Khushal Khan Khattak University in 2012, the college is now affiliated with Khushal Khan Khattak University of district Karak.

Overview and history 
Government Post Graduate College Karak is one of the most renowned college in Karak. It was established in 1972. The college was  started as Intermediate level college in two rooms small building. The college was moved to its current campus and degree classes were started in 1974. Science classes were started in 1977. In 1988, the college was upgraded to Post graduate level and master level degree courses in Mathematics and English were started. A 4 years BS Program in Physics was started in 2010 in accordance with national education policy 2009.

Vision 
The college cherishes it as a holy dream to prepare enlightened future builders and leaders of the society. The graduates of this institution are to shoulder national and global responsibilities with humanistic approach towards solution of variegated issues that the present world is facing.

Departments and faculties 
The college has the following departments and faculties.

Social Sciences
 Department of Economics
 Department of English
 Department of Geography
 Department of Health and Physical Education
 Department of Islamiyat
 Department of Law
 Department of Pak Studies
 Department of Pashto
 Department of Political Science
 Department of Urdu

Biological Sciences
 Department of Botany
 Department of Zoology

Physical Sciences
 Department of Chemistry
 Department of Computer Science
 Department of Mathematics
 Department of Statistics
 Department of Physics

Programs 
The college currently offers the following programs.

Intermediate Courses
 FSc – Pre-Medical (2 years)
 FSc – Pre-Engineering (2 years)
 FSc – Computer Science (2 years)
 FA – General Science (2 years)
 FA – Humanities (2 years)

BS Degrees (4 years)
 BS Physics
 BS Mathematics
 BS English
 BS Botany
 BS Zoology
 BS Chemistry
 BS Political Science
 BS Economics

Bs pashto
Bs Urdu

See also  
 Khushal Khan Khattak University
 Government Post Graduate College Bannu
 Government Post Graduate College Lakki Marwat

External links 
 Government Post Graduate College Karak Official Website

References 

Public universities and colleges in Khyber Pakhtunkhwa
Karak District